Catherine Pickens Upson Clark (February 22, 1851 – February 18, 1935) was an American writer. She wrote articles for Godey's Lady's Book, Atlantic Monthly, Christian Herald, and Harper's Magazine. She was an editor of the Springfield Republican, Good Cheer Magazine, and later the New York Evening Post. She published several books, short stories, and one novel.

Biography
She was born in Camden, Alabama in 1851 to Edwin Upson and Priscilla Maxwell. She was raised in Charlemont, Massachusetts and she graduated from Wheaton Female Seminary in Norton, Massachusetts in 1869. In 1874 she married Edward Perkins Clark, and they had three sons, Charles Upson Clark, John Kirkland Clark and George Maxwell Clark. She died on February 18, 1935.

Selected works
That Mary Ann: the Story of a Country Summer (Boston: D. Lothrop Co., 1893, illustrated by M. L. Kirk)

Additional Information
 Kate Upson Clark Papers, 1851-1935, Sophia Smith Collection, Smith College.

References

External links
 
 

1851 births
1935 deaths
People from Camden, Alabama
People from Charlemont, Massachusetts